Gilberts Cove is a community in the Canadian province of Nova Scotia, located in the municipal district of Digby in Digby County.

Gilberts Cove, 18–20 km west of Digby on the 101 Highway, is a charming spot and the home of  "The Greatest Little Lighthouse in Canada".   The lighthouse is open 10:00 am to 4 pm Monday to Saturday; Sunday noon to 4 pm from mid-June to mid-September. Nearby, The Barn at The Point caters to visitors with a four-star B&B and cafe serving homemade food. Gilberts Cove (or 'Gilbert Cove') is so named after Colonel Thomas Gilbert who first settled here and received a Land Grant from George III of 600 acres.

Communities in Digby County, Nova Scotia
General Service Areas in Nova Scotia